IslamInSpanish is an educational, non-profit organization that seeks to educate Latinos about Islam in the Spanish language worldwide through audiovisual media (DVDs, TV, audio CDs, radio and interactive website). It distributes materials within the United States and to Spanish-speaking countries. It was established in Houston, Texas.

In 2013 IslamInSpanish began providing khutbahs (sermons) in Spanish at two locations in the Houston area. The weekly sessions are broadcast online to the worldwide Spanish-speaking Muslim population. In 2016, IslamInSpanish opened up the first Spanish-speaking mosque in Houston. IslamInSpanish, in cooperation with the Texas Dawah Convention, organized the first National Latino Muslim Convention in December 2016.

The founder is Jaime Fletcher.

See also

 Latino Muslims
 Alianza Islámica
 Black Muslims
 Islam in the United States
 Latin American Muslims
 Latino American Dawah Organization

References

External links
IslamInSpanish.org.

Non-profit organizations based in Houston
Islamic organizations based in the United States
Spanish-language education
Islamic education